Platymantis paengi, the Panay limestone frog, is a species of frog in the family Ceratobatrachidae. It is endemic to the Philippines. It is only known from Mount Lihidan, a limestone karst mountain of Pandan, Antique Province, Panay Island.

References

Platymantis
Amphibians of the Philippines
Amphibians described in 2007